San Francisco Menéndez is a municipality in the Ahuachapán department of El Salvador.

Municipalities of the Ahuachapán Department